Anyue is a county under the administration of the prefecture-level city of Ziyang in southeastern Sichuan province, China, located in between the Fu and Tuo Rivers. Anyue is famous for its lemon plant and Buddhist stone carvings.

The Grove of the Reclining Buddha (Wofo Yuan 臥佛院) contains the largest single collection of Buddhist texts carved in stone as well as artwork from the Tang Dynasty. Texts are located in a series of caves

Climate

References

External links
 Official website of Anyue

County-level divisions of Sichuan
Ziyang